Juan Salcedo (1520 – December 1562) was a Roman Catholic prelate who served as the Archbishop of Santo Domingo (1562).

Biography
Juan Salcedo was born in Granada, Spain. On 9 January 1562, he was appointed by the King of Spain and confirmed by Pope Pius IV as Bishop of Santo Domingo. In the same year, he was consecrated bishop by Pedro Guerrero Logroño, Archbishop of Granada. He served as Archbishop of Santo Domingo until his death in December 1562.

References

External links and additional sources
 (for Chronology of Bishops) 
 (for Chronology of Bishops) 

1520 births
1562 deaths
Roman Catholic archbishops of Santo Domingo
Bishops appointed by Pope Pius IV
Clergy from Granada
Spanish emigrants to the Dominican Republic
16th-century Roman Catholic archbishops in the Dominican Republic